"Freystadt" is also the German names for Kisielice and Kożuchów, Poland.

Freystadt (Northern Bavarian: Freystod) is a town  in the district of Neumarkt in Bavaria. It is situated near the Rhine-Main-Danube Canal, 14 km southwest of Neumarkt in der Oberpfalz, and 33 km southeast of Nuremberg.

Sons and daughters of the city 

 Jean Paul Egide Martini (1741-1816), German-French composer
 Ernst Schweninger (1850-1924), German physician and medical historian, physician of Otto von Bismarck.
 Hanna Ludwig (1918–2014), contralto and mezzo-soprano, and academic voice teacher

References

Neumarkt (district)